The A-70 is a rotor kite that was sold by Aerotechnik.

Design and development

The A-70 was the first product of Aerotechnik, later merged and renamed Evektor-Aerotechnik. The A-70 was a towed rotor kite. The two seat variant placed seats in front of and behind the rotor mast.

Variants
Single seat and two seat variants were constructed.

Specifications Aerotechnik A-70

References

Rotor kites